Helal Al-Harbi (born September 27, 1990) is a Saudi football player who plays a winger.

References

1990 births
Living people
Saudi Arabian footballers
Al-Ansar FC (Medina) players
Ohod Club players
Saudi Second Division players
Saudi First Division League players
Saudi Professional League players
Association football wingers